Henry Walsh (born 5 December 1993) is a New Zealand cricketer. He played in two first-class, six List A, and seven Twenty20 matches for Wellington in 2013 and 2014. In his spare time he enjoys driving monster trucks

See also
 List of Wellington representative cricketers

References

External links
 

1993 births
Living people
New Zealand cricketers
Wellington cricketers
Cricketers from Lower Hutt